Freeman is an American sitcom pilot created by Bernie Kukoff, Jeff Harris, and Paul Mooney. It premiered on ABC on June 19, 1976, but was not picked up for a full series.

Plot 
Freeman revolves around the conflict between the Wainrights, a middle class, New York-based family which has seemingly found its dream house in an affluent Connecticut suburb, and Freeman, the house's recalcitrant, African American erstwhile inhabitant, who just happens to be a ghost.

Cast 
 Stu Gilliam as Freeman, 
 Beverly Sanders as Helen Wainright
 Linden Chiles as Dwight Wainright
 Jimmy Baio as Timmy Wainright
 Melinda Dillon as Madam Arkadina

Reception 
Variety critic Bob Knight (aka Bok) commends the cast as a whole, while viewing Gilliam's performance in the title role—not to mention the ubiquitous "trick" camerawork—as both overdone and underwhelming.
Gilliam appeared without his upper teeth and gave the role an overplayed Fred Sanford flavor, so the pilot had a strained sound despite good playing by Beverly Sanders, Linden Chiles and Jimmy Baio [...] Sanders was especially telling with her timing and delivery. Melinda Dillon as a late-arriving ghost-finder had the choicest material in her brief appearance and made the most of it [... T]he standard now-you-see-him, now-you-don't camera tricks were worked overtime, with no indication that that threadbare gimmick could keep "Freeman" going very long as a series.
Almost diametrically opposed is the take offered by Michigan Chronicle columnist Bill Lane.
Stu Gilliam scored mightily in his television film role of 'Freeman,' the ghost who became a permanent guest in the home of a white family. A lot of laughs when Gilliam cracked that oldtimer on the show, 'Don't let the doorknob hitcha where the bulldog bitcha.' And just think, Gilliam got the role when the producers, calling on Godfrey Cambridge, found the latter bedded down with the flu.

Sadly for all those connected with the show, it was Variety's view that evidently prevailed at ABC; no additional episodes—nor even news—of this prospective series ever surfaced.

See also 
 List of television series canceled before airing an episode

References

External links 

American black sitcoms
American fantasy television series
Fantasy comedy television series
Ghosts in television
Television shows set in Connecticut
Television pilots not picked up as a series
1976 television specials